Samuel Henry Piles (December 28, 1858March 11, 1940) was an American politician, attorney, and diplomat who served as a United States senator from Washington.

Early life
Piles was born near Smithland, Kentucky, the son of Samuel Henry Piles (d. 1904) and Gabriella Lillard. The senior Piles was sheriff of Livingston County, and later practiced law. Samuel Jr. attended private schools in Kentucky before studying law.

Career 
Piles was admitted to the bar in 1883, and commenced practice in Snohomish, Territory of Washington.

He moved to Spokane in 1886 and later in the same year to Seattle, where he practiced law. He was assistant prosecuting attorney for the third judicial district of the Territory of Washington from 1887 to 1889 and city attorney of Seattle from 1888 to 1889. He was also general counsel of the Pacific Coast Company from 1895 to 1905.

In January 1905, Piles was elected to the U.S. Senate. He served one term, March 4, 1905, to March 3, 1911. He was not a candidate for renomination in 1910. While in the Senate, he was chairman of the Committee on Coast and Insular Survey (Fifty-ninth through Sixty-first Congresses). After leaving the Senate, he resumed the practice of law in Seattle.

In 1922, Piles was appointed by President Warren G. Harding as Minister to Colombia, an office he held until 1928.

Personal life
In 1891, Piles married Mary E. Barnard of Henderson, Kentucky. They were the parents of three children: Ross Barnard, Ruth Lillard, and Samuel Henry.

He retired from active pursuits and moved to Los Angeles, California, where he died in 1940. He was interred in the Lake View Cemetery.

References

Sources

Books

Newspapers

Magazines

External links 

 

1858 births
1940 deaths
People from Livingston County, Kentucky
Politicians from Spokane, Washington
Lawyers from Seattle
Ambassadors of the United States to Colombia
Republican Party United States senators from Washington (state)
Washington (state) Republicans
Lawyers from Spokane, Washington